The U.S. Government Accountability Office (GAO) is a legislative branch  government agency that provides auditing, evaluative, and investigative services for the United States Congress. It is the supreme audit institution of the federal government of the United States. It identifies its core "mission values" as: accountability, integrity, and reliability. It is also known as the "congressional watchdog".

Powers of GAO
The work of the GAO is done at the request of congressional committees or subcommittees or is mandated by public laws or committee reports. It also undertakes research under the authority of the Comptroller General. It supports congressional oversight by:
 auditing agency operations to determine whether federal funds are being spent efficiently and effectively;
 investigating allegations of illegal and improper activities;
 reporting on how well government programs and policies are meeting their objectives;
 performing policy analyses and outlining options for congressional consideration;
 issuing legal decisions and opinions;
 advising Congress and the heads of executive agencies about ways to make government more efficient and effective.

Products of GAO

Products of the GAO include the following:
 reports and written correspondence;
 testimonies and statements for the record, where the former are delivered orally by one or more GAO senior executives at a congressional hearing and the latter are provided for inclusion in the Congressional Record;
 briefings, which are usually given directly to congressional staff members;
 legal decisions and opinions resolving bid protests and addressing issues of appropriations law as well as opinions on the scope and exercise of authority of federal officers;
 science and technology assessments.

The GAO also produces special publications on specific issues of general interest to many Americans, such as its report on the fiscal future of the United States, GAO's role in the federal bid protest process, and critical issues for congressional consideration related to improving the nation's image abroad.

History
The GAO was established as the General Accounting Office by the Budget and Accounting Act of 1921. The act required the head of the GAO to:  According to the GAO's current mission statement, the agency exists to support the Congress in meeting its constitutional responsibilities and to help improve the performance and ensure the accountability of the federal government for the benefit of the American people.

The name was changed in 2004 to the Government Accountability Office by the GAO Human Capital Reform Act to better reflect the mission of the office. The GAO's auditors conduct not only financial audits, but also engage in a wide assortment of performance audits.

Over the years, the GAO has been referred to as "The Congressional Watchdog" and "The Taxpayers' Best Friend" for its frequent audits and investigative reports that have uncovered waste and inefficiency in government. News media often draw attention to the GAO's work by publishing stories on the findings, conclusions, and recommendations of its reports. Members of Congress also frequently cite the GAO's work in statements to the press, congressional hearings, and floor debates on proposed legislation.  In 2007 the Partnership for Public Service ranked the GAO second on its list of the best places to work in the federal government and Washingtonian magazine included the GAO on its 2007 list of great places to work in Washington, a list that encompasses the public, private, and non-profit sectors.

The GAO is headed by the Comptroller General of the U.S., a professional and non-partisan position in the U.S. government. The comptroller general is appointed by the president, by and with the advice and consent of the Senate, for a fifteen-year, non-renewable term. The president selects a nominee from a list of at least three individuals recommended by an eight-member bipartisan, bicameral commission of congressional leaders. During such term, the comptroller general has standing to pursue litigation to compel access to federal agency information. The comptroller general may not be removed by the president, but only by Congress through impeachment or joint resolution for specific reasons. Since 1921, there have been only seven comptrollers general, and no formal attempt has ever been made to remove a comptroller general.

Labor-management relations became fractious during the nine-year tenure of the seventh comptroller general, David M. Walker. On September 19, 2007, GAO analysts voted by a margin of two to one (897–445), in a 75% turnout, to establish the first union in the GAO's 86-year history. The analysts voted to affiliate with the International Federation of Professional and Technical Engineers (IFPTE), a member union of the AFL–CIO. There are more than 1,800 analysts in the GAO analysts bargaining unit; the local voted to name itself IFPTE Local 1921, in honor of the date of the GAO's establishment. On February 14, 2008, the GAO analysts' union approved its first-ever negotiated pay contract with management; of just over 1,200 votes, 98% were in favor of the contract.

The GAO also establishes standards for audits of government organizations, programs, activities, and functions, and of government assistance received by contractors, nonprofit organizations, and other nongovernmental organizations. These standards, often referred to as Generally Accepted Government Auditing Standards (GAGAS), are to be followed by auditors and audit organizations when required by law, regulation, agreement, contract, or policy. These standards pertain to auditors' professional qualifications, the quality of audit effort, and the characteristics of professional and meaningful audit reports.

In 1992, the GAO hosted the XIV INCOSAI, the fourteenth triennial convention of the International Organization of Supreme Audit Institutions (INTOSAI).

Reports

The GAO is a United States government electronic data provider, as all of its reports are available on its website, except for certain reports whose distribution is limited to official use in order to protect national security. The variety of their reports' topics range from Federal Budget and Fiscal Issues to Financial Management, Education, Retirement Issues, Defense, Homeland Security, Administration of Justice, Health Care, Information Management and Technology, Natural Resources, Environment, International Affairs, Trade, Financial Markets, Housing, Government Management and Human Capital, and Science and Technology Assessments and Analytics. The GAO often produces highlights of its reports that serve as a statement for the record for various subcommittees of the United States Congress.

Most GAO studies and reports are initiated by requests from members of Congress, including requests mandated in statute, and so reflect concerns of current political import, for example to study the impact of a government-wide hiring freeze. Many reports are issued periodically and take a long view of U.S. agencies' operations. The GAO also produces annual reports on key issues such as Duplication and Cost savings and High-Risk Update.

The GAO prepares some 900 reports annually. The GAO publishes reports and information relating to, inter alia:

Financial statements of the U.S. government
Each year the GAO issues an audit report on the financial statements of the United States Government. The 2010 Financial Report of the United States Government was released on December 21, 2010. The accompanying press release states that the GAO 'cannot render an opinion on the 2010 consolidated financial statements of the federal government, because of widespread material internal control weaknesses, significant uncertainties, and other limitations'.

U.S. public debt
As part of its initiative to advocate sustainability, the GAO publishes a Federal Fiscal Outlook Report, as well as data relating to the deficit. The U.S. deficit is presented on a cash rather than accruals basis, although the GAO notes that the accrual deficit "provides more information on the longer-term implications of the government's annual operations".
In FY 2010, the US federal government had a net operating cost of $2,080 billion, although since this includes accounting provisions (estimates of future liabilities), the cash deficit is $1,294 billion.

Quinquennial strategic plan
The most recent GAO strategic plan, for 2018–2023, sets out four goals, namely:
Address current and emerging challenges to the well-being and financial security of the American people;
Help the Congress respond to changing security threats and the challenges of global interdependence;
Help transform the Federal Government to address national challenges;
Maximize the value of the GAO by enabling quality, timely service to the Congress and by being a leading practices federal agency.

Forensic Audits and Investigative Service (FAIS)
The Forensic Audits and Investigative Service (FAIS) team provides Congress with high-quality forensic audits and investigations of fraud, waste, and abuse; other special investigations; and security and vulnerability assessments. Its work cuts across a diverse array of government programs administered by the IRS, the Centers for Medicare and Medicaid Services, the Department of Veterans Affairs, and the Department of Homeland Security, among others.

Bid protests
Unsuccessful bidders for government contracts may submit protests if they have reason to challenge an agency's decision, and the GAO may then release a report on the decision, redacted if necessary. Various GAO decisions have confirmed that:

Technology assessments
After the closing of the Office of Technology Assessment (OTA) in 1995, Congress directed the GAO to conduct a technology assessment (TA) pilot program. Between 2002 and 2005, three reports were completed–-use of biometrics for border security, cyber security for critical infrastructure protection, and technologies for protecting structures in wildland fires. The GAO reports and technology assessments, which are made available to the public, have become essential vehicles for understanding science and technology (S&T) implications of policies considered by the Congress.

Since 2008, Congress has established a permanent TA function within the GAO. This new operational role augments GAO's performance audits related to S&T issues, including effectiveness and efficiency of U.S. federal programs. In 2010, the GAO joined the European Parliamentary Technology Assessment (EPTA) as an associate member. In 2019, the GAO established a new mission team, the Science, Technology Assessment, and Analytics team, which has primary responsibility for technology assessments.

The GAO has published a TA Design Handbook to help technology assessment teams analyze the impact of technology and make complex issues more easily understood and useful to policymakers. The GAO defines TA as the "thorough and balanced analysis of significant primary, secondary, indirect, and delayed interactions of a technological innovation with society, the environment, and the economy and the present and foreseen consequences and impacts of those interactions." Recognizing that the effects of those interactions can have implications, the GAO has in some of its products included policy options. The Technology Assessment section of its website lists GAO's public TA reports.

See also

 Title 4 of the Code of Federal Regulations

Offices
 Comptroller and Auditor General
 Comptroller
 Corporate title
 Inspector general
 Comptroller General of the United States
 Director of audit
 Treasurer

Non-governmental organizations (NGOs)
 Government Accountability Project
 Project On Government Oversight

Audit
 Auditor independence
 Negative assurance
 Positive assurance

International
 Australia: Australian National Audit Office
 Botswana: Office of the Auditor General (Botswana)
 Brazil: Court of Accounts of the Union
 Canada: Auditor General of Canada
 European Union: Court of Auditors
 Hong Kong: Director of Audit of Hong Kong
 India: Comptroller and Auditor General of India
 Mexico: Auditoría Superior de la Federación
 Philippines: Commission on Audit
 Republic of China (Taiwan): Control Yuan
 United Kingdom: National Audit Office

References

Citations

Sources

External links

 
 General Accounting Office Reports, on the website of the Federation of American Scientists

 
1921 establishments in Washington, D.C.
Agencies of the United States Congress
Auditing in the United States
Government agencies established in 1921
Government audit
Open government in the United States
Supreme audit institutions
Technology assessment organisations